2903 Zhuhai, provisional designation , is a stony background or Marian asteroid from the central regions of the asteroid belt, approximately  in diameter. It was discovered on 23 October 1981, by astronomers at Purple Mountain Observatory near Nanking, China. The S-type asteroid has a rotation period of 5.26 hours. It was named for the Chinese city of Zhuhai.

Orbit and classification 

Based on osculating Keplerian orbital elements, Zhuhai has also been classified as a member of the Maria family, a large family of stony asteroids, named after 170 Maria. When applying the hierarchical clustering method to its proper orbital elements, the asteroid is both a non-family asteroid of the main belt's background population (according to Nesvorný), as well as a core member of the Maria family (according to Milani and Knežević).

It orbits the Sun in the central main-belt at a distance of 2.4–2.7 AU once every 4 years and 1 month (1,497 days; semi-major axis of 2.56 AU). Its orbit has an eccentricity of 0.06 and an inclination of 14° with respect to the ecliptic.

Physical characteristics 

Zhuhai has been characterized as a common, stony S-type asteroid by Pan-STARRS photometric survey.

Rotation period 

Until 2012, three rotational lightcurves of Zhuhai have been obtained from photometric observations. Best-rated lightcurve from the Oakley Southern Sky Observatory gave a well-defined rotation period of 5.263 hours with a brightness amplitude of 0.32 magnitude.

Diameter and albedo 

According to the surveys carried out by the Japanese Akari satellite and the NEOWISE mission of NASA's Wide-field Infrared Survey Explorer, Zhuhai measures between 13.58 and 14.01 kilometers in diameter and its surface has an albedo between 0.146 and 0.276. The Collaborative Asteroid Lightcurve Link assumes a standard albedo for stony asteroids of 0.20 and calculates a diameter of 13.58 kilometers based on an absolute magnitude of 11.7.

Naming 

This minor planet was named after the city of located in the Guangdong province of southern China. The official naming citation was published by the Minor Planet Center on 11 March 1990.

References

External links 
 Asteroid Lightcurve Database (LCDB), query form (info )
 Dictionary of Minor Planet Names, Google books
 Discovery Circumstances: Numbered Minor Planets (1)-(5000) – Minor Planet Center
 
 

002903
002903
Named minor planets
19811023